Dennert is a surname. Notable people with the surname include:

 Drew Dennert (born 1995), American politician
 Herbert Dennert, researcher and publisher of information displayed on Dennert Fir Trees
 Paul Dennert (born 1937), American politician
 Pauline Dennert (1926–2012), American baseball player